Ecomet Burley Jr. (June 6, 1954 – February 13, 2020) was a Canadian football player who played professionally for the Winnipeg Blue Bombers, Hamilton Tiger-Cats and Toronto Argonauts.

References

1954 births
2020 deaths
Toronto Argonauts players
Winnipeg Blue Bombers players
Hamilton Tiger-Cats players
Texas Tech Red Raiders football players
American players of Canadian football
Canadian football defensive linemen
People from Palestine, Texas